Obory may refer to the following places:
Obory, Chełmno County in Kuyavian-Pomeranian Voivodeship (north-central Poland)
Obory, Golub-Dobrzyń County in Kuyavian-Pomeranian Voivodeship (north-central Poland)
Obory, Toruń County in Kuyavian-Pomeranian Voivodeship (north-central Poland)
Obory, Piaseczno County in Masovian Voivodeship (east-central Poland)
Obory, Sochaczew County in Masovian Voivodeship (east-central Poland)
Obory, Konin County in Greater Poland Voivodeship (west-central Poland)
Obory, Pleszew County in Greater Poland Voivodeship (west-central Poland)
Obory, Pomeranian Voivodeship (north Poland)
Obory, Czech Republic